The Packard Service Building is a building located in northwest Portland, Oregon listed on the National Register of Historic Places.

See also
 National Register of Historic Places listings in Northwest Portland, Oregon

References

1910 establishments in Oregon
Chicago school architecture in Oregon
Commercial buildings completed in 1910
National Register of Historic Places in Portland, Oregon
Northwest District, Portland, Oregon
Portland Historic Landmarks